Adinandra lasiopetala is a species of plant in the Pentaphylacaceae family. It is endemic to Sri Lanka.

Uses
Wood - light construction.

Culture
Known as "රට මිහිරිය - rata mihiriya" in Sinhala.

References

Jstor.org:  Adinandra lasiopetala
Theplantlist.org: Adinandra lasiopetala

lasiopetala
Endemic flora of Sri Lanka
Trees of Sri Lanka
Taxa named by Robert Wight
Taxa named by Jacques Denys Choisy